Water skiing competitions at the 2011 Pan American Games in Guadalajara were held from October 20 to October 23 at the Boca Laguna Water Ski Track.

Medal summary

Medal table

Men's events

Women's events

Schedule
All times are Central Daylight time (UTC-5).

Qualification
The top seven countries at the 2010 Pan American Championship in Santiago, Chile + Mexico can send a maximum of 4 athletes (up to 3 for any gender) + one wakeboard athlete. All other countries can enter a maximum of 2 athletes (1 male and 1 female) and 1 wakeboard athlete. The maximum quota is 40 male, 32 female and 8 wakeboard (male only) athletes (80 total). The wakeboard category is full, so countries not qualified can only send water skiers, if they meet the minimum requirements.

Entries
The following countries will participate:

References

 
Events at the 2011 Pan American Games
2011